Trambesh Peak is the ice-covered peak of elevation 1600 m at the northwest extremity of Gutsal Ridge in Stribog Mountains on Brabant Island in the Palmer Archipelago, Antarctica.  It surmounts the heads of Balanstra Glacier to the east and Hippocrates Glacier to the southwest.

The peak is named after the town of Polski Trambesh, and the settlements of Gorski Goren Trambesh and Gorski Dolen Trambesh in Northern Bulgaria.

Location
British mapping in 1980 and 2008.

Maps
 Antarctic Digital Database (ADD). Scale 1:250000 topographic map of Antarctica. Scientific Committee on Antarctic Research (SCAR). Since 1993, regularly upgraded and updated.
British Antarctic Territory. Scale 1:200000 topographic map. DOS 610 Series, Sheet W 64 62. Directorate of Overseas Surveys, Tolworth, UK, 1980.
Brabant Island to Argentine Islands. Scale 1:250000 topographic map. British Antarctic Survey, 2008.

References
 Bulgarian Antarctic Gazetteer. Antarctic Place-names Commission. (details in Bulgarian, basic data in English)
 Trambesh Peak. SCAR Composite Antarctic Gazetteer.

External links
 Trambesh Peak. Copernix satellite image

Mountains of the Palmer Archipelago
Bulgaria and the Antarctic